Hatem Ben Rabah, Hatem Berrabeh, or 'Hatem Berrabeh  was a Tunisian actor.

Biography
Ben Rabah played starring roles in TV shows El Kottab Al Bab and Liyam Kif Errih under the direction of Slaheddine Essid.

He also had roles in the movies La Danse du Vent, A Summer in Goulette, and The Silences of the Palace''.

References

Place of death missing
2018 deaths
Tunisian male film actors
Place of birth missing
Tunisian male television actors
1970 births